Augustin Gustav Krist (12 December 1894 – 2 March 1964) was the first Czechoslovakian to be appointed to officiate at a FIFA World Cup final match when he was linesman in the 1938 final between Hungary and Italy in Paris. He was born in Kroměříž.

Krist had earlier been the match referee in the game between Cuba and Sweden in which Sweden won 8–0.  Krist had come to prominence in European football circles in the middle of the 1930s, assuming control in various internationals.

References

External links 
 
 
 

1894 births
1964 deaths
Czech football referees
Czechoslovak football referees
FIFA World Cup referees
FIFA World Cup Final match officials
1938 FIFA World Cup referees
People from Kroměříž
Sportspeople from the Zlín Region